Cedrela is a genus of several species in the mahogany family, Meliaceae. They are evergreen or dry-season deciduous trees with pinnate leaves, native to the tropical and subtropical New World, from southern Mexico south to northern Argentina.

Taxonomy 
These species are currently accepted:
Cedrela angustifolia Sessé & Moc. ex C.DC. – Argentina, Bolivia, Brazil, Ecuador, Peru
Cedrela discolor S.F. Blake
Cedrela dugesii S.Watson
Cedrela fissilis Vell. – Costa Rica south to Argentina
Cedrela kuelapensis T.D. Penn. & Daza
Cedrela longipetiolulata Harms
Cedrela molinensis T.D. Penn. & Reynel
Cedrela monroensis T.D. Penn.
Cedrela montana Moritz ex Turcz – Colombia & Ecuador
Cedrela nebulosa T.D. Penn. & Daza
Cedrela odorata L. –  West Indies and from 24° N in Mexico south to 28° S in Argentina
Cedrela oaxacensis C.DC. & Rose
Cedrela saltensis M.A. Zapater & del Castillo
Cedrela salvadorensis Standl. – Central America
Cedrela tonduzii C.DC. – Central America
Cedrela weberbaueri Harms

Distribution and habitat
Cedrela odorata is the most common species in the genus, widespread in seasonally dry tropical and subtropical forests; it is deciduous in the dry season which may last several months. C. angustifolia and C. montana occur at higher altitudes in moister conditions, and are evergreen or only briefly deciduous.

Uses
Cedrela odorata is a very important timber tree, producing a lightweight fragrant wood with very good resistance to termites and other wood-boring insects, and also rot-resistant outdoors. The wood is often sold under the name "Spanish-cedar" (like many trade names, confusing as it is neither Spanish nor a cedar), and is the traditional wood used for making cigar boxes, as well as being used for general outdoor and construction work, paneling and veneer wood. It is also used for the necks and linings (interior strips of wood that attach the top and bottom of the guitar to the sides) of classical guitars, as well as bodies and necks of some electric guitars. Some species are now CITES-listed, in particular Cedrela odorata. It is also grown as an ornamental tree, and has become naturalized in some areas in Africa, southeast Asia and Hawaii. The other species have similar wood, but are less-used due to scarcity.

References

External links
CITES database entrance

 
Meliaceae genera